The Tipperary Senior Hurling Championship is an annual club competition between the top Tipperary clubs. The winners of the Tipperary Championship qualify to represent their county in the Munster Club Championship, the winners of which go on to the All-Ireland Senior Club Hurling Championship.

The Tipperary County Champions in 2006 were Toomevara who became champions with a win over Nenagh Éire Óg. The Tipperary senior hurling championship is probably the most complicated system in Ireland as it strives to accommodate 25 teams. A knockout divisional system and group backdoor system has been introduced to accommodate these teams. Before the new system, the county championship was run on a divisional basis with the teams in the divisional finals going into the county quarter-finals and proceeding from there. It may not be long before this system is re-introduced because of the complexity of the current championship.

2006 Divisional Championship

North Tipperary
The North Tipperary Championship is contested by nine teams: Borris-Ileigh, Burgess, Kildangan, Kilruane McDonaghs, Moneygall, Nenagh Éire Óg, Portroe, Roscrea, Toomevara.
The championship is a knockout competition with the losers apart from the semifinal runner-up entering the County Championship. The winners of the North Championship advance to the quarter final of the County Championship.

Mid Tipperary
The Mid Tipperary Championship is contested by seven teams: Boherlahan-Dualla, Drom-Inch, Holycross-Ballycahill, J.K. Bracken's, Loughmore-Castleiney, Thurles Sarsfields and Upperchurch-Drombane.
The championship is a knockout competition with the losers apart from the one semifinal runner-up (Upperchurch-Drombane in 2006) entering the County Championship. The winners of the Mid Championship advance to the county quarter final. Drom-Inch receive a bye to the semifinal.

West Tipperary
The West Tipperary Championship is contested by five teams: Cappawhite, Cashel King Cormacs, Clonoulty-Rossmore, Éire Óg Annacarty and Knockavilla-Donaskeigh Kickhams. The championship is a knockout competition with the winners advancing to the quarter final of the County Championship. The other four contestants also play in the first phase of the County Championship (group stage).

South Tipperary
The South Tipperary Championship is contested by four teams: Ballingarry, Carrick Swans, Killenaule and Mullinahone.
The championship is a 'knockout' competition. However, the three semifinalists losers going into the County Championship. The winners of the South Championship advance directly to the quarter final of the County championship, while the other three divisional semifinalists also play in the first phase of the County Championship (group stage).

2006 Tipperary County Championship
The 14 teams defeated in their divisional championship are divided into groups of 4 with the winner of each group going into the next round. The teams that finish bottom in these groups go through to the relegation playoffs.

Group 1

Group 2

Group 3

Group 4

Relegation
The bottom teams in the groups fight out relegation playoffs with the loser going to intermediate status next year. The four teams are Portroe, Galtee Rovers, Carrick Swans and Cashel King Cormacs.

Galtee Rovers are relegated to intermediate status.

Round 2
In this round the three defeated divisional semifinalists not in the group stages namely Roscrea, Borris-Ileigh, Upperchurch-Drombane meet the group winners namely Burgess, Loughmore-Castleiney, Nenagh Éire Óg and Nenagh Éire Óg received a bye to round 3.In round 3 the winners of round 2 will meet the divisional runners-up.

Round 3
In this round the four defeated divisional finalists not in the group stages namely Kildangan, Boherlahan-Dualla, Clonoulty-Rossmore and Killenaule meet the winners of round 2.Nenagh Éire Óg received a bye to this round.

Quarter-finals
In this round the four divisional winners namely Toomevara, Drom-Inch, Mullinahone and Knockavilla-Donaskeigh Kickhams meet the winners of round 3.

Semifinals

Final

External links
Tipperary on Hoganstand
Tipperary Club GAA
Premierview

Tipperary Senior Hurling Championship
2006